Thiruvallikeni is a station on the Chennai MRTS. Located just behind the Marina Campus of the University of Madras along the Marina Beach, it exclusively serves the Chennai MRTS. The station serves the neighbourhood of Triplicane.

History
Thiruvallikeni station was opened on 19 October 1997, as part of the first phase of the Chennai MRTS network.

Structure
The station is an elevated one built on the banks of the Buckingham Canal like most other MRTS stations. The station building consists of 940 sq m of parking area in its basement.

Service and connections
Thiruvallikeni station is the sixth station on the MRTS line to Velachery. In the return direction from Velachery, it is currently the thirteenth station towards Chennai Beach station, which will become the sixteenth station upon completion of the entire stretch up to St. Thomas Mount.

See also
 Chennai MRTS
 Chennai suburban railway
 Chennai Metro
 Transport in Chennai

References

Chennai Mass Rapid Transit System stations
Railway stations in Chennai
Railway stations opened in 1997